This is a recap of the 1967 season for the Professional Bowlers Association (PBA) Tour.  It was the tour's ninth season, and consisted of 33 events. Dave Davis was the runaway winner of the Sporting News PBA Player of the Year award, as he won six titles during the season and became the first multiple winner of the PBA National Championship (he also won the event in 1965). Jim Stefanich captured his first major title at the Firestone Tournament of Champions. The ToC included the first-ever nationally televised 300 game, rolled by Jack Biondolillo in the opening match of the live finals.

Tournament schedule

References

External links
1967 Season Schedule

Professional Bowlers Association seasons
1967 in bowling